This is a list of all the governors of provinces of the Democratic Republic of the Congo.

Current governors

See also 
Lists of provincial governors of the Democratic Republic of the Congo

References 

governors
Politics of the Democratic Republic of the Congo
Governors